The Siberian Elm cultivar Ulmus pumila 'Manchu' was raised by Stewarts Nurseries, Sutherland, Saskatchewan, c. 1951 from seed collected by Mr Ptitsin from near Harbin, China.

Description
Not available.

Pests and diseases
See under Ulmus pumila.

Cultivation
'Manchu' was found to be hardy in Saskatchewan. The tree was superseded in the United States by 'Dropmore'. It is not known whether 'Manchu' remains in cultivation.

References

Siberian elm cultivar
Ulmus articles missing images
Ulmus